Lourdes Benedicto (born November 12, 1974) is an American actress of Filipino and Dominican descent. She is known for her roles on the television series 24 as Carrie Turner, as Eva Rios on The Nine, and for her role as Alicia Lawson on the short-lived series Cashmere Mafia.

Early life, family and education
Benedicto was born in Brooklyn, New York City, New York. 

She graduated from Carnegie Mellon University in Pittsburgh, Pennsylvania.

Career
Benedicto has had recurring roles on NYPD Blue (1996–97, 2000), ER (2001), Dawson's Creek (2001), 24 (2003). She played Eva Rios in The Nine (2006–07) and Valerie Stevens in the remake of the science fiction television series V (2009–10). Other series performances have been in Major Crimes (2017), Animal Kingdom (2018), and The Kominsky Method (2021).

Her film debut was in Permanent Midnight (1998). She had subsequent roles in Drive Me Crazy (1999), The Fighting Temptations (2003) and Unbeatable Harold (2005).

Filmography

Television series

Films

References

External links
 
 

1974 births
Living people
People from Brooklyn
American television actresses
American film actresses
Carnegie Mellon University College of Fine Arts alumni
Convent of the Sacred Heart (NYC) alumni
Hispanic and Latino American actresses
American actresses of Filipino descent
Schools of the Sacred Heart alumni
Actresses from New York City
American people of Dominican Republic descent